Gilbert Gets Tiger-Itis is a 1915 British silent short comedy film directed by Maurice Elvey and starring Fred Groves and Elisabeth Risdon.

Cast
 Fred Groves as Gilbert  
 Elisabeth Risdon as Mrs. Gilbert

References

Bibliography
 Murphy, Robert. Directors in British and Irish Cinema: A Reference Companion. British Film Institute, 2006.

External links
 

1915 films
British comedy films
British silent short films
1910s English-language films
Films directed by Maurice Elvey
1915 comedy films
British black-and-white films
1910s British films
Silent comedy films